The DH class was a class of diesel-hydraulic locomotives built by Walkers Limited, Maryborough for Queensland Railways between 1966 and 1974.

History
In 1966, Queensland Railways tested a Walkers Limited built diesel-hydraulic shunting locomotive. This was later purchased and by 1974, the 73 DH class locomotives had taken over shunting duties in most Queensland yards. They were also used on short-distance freight services. With the closure of many freight yards and the move to longer trains, withdrawals started in the 1980s. Many were sold for further use on Queensland sugar cane railways.

29 were rebuilt to  gauge for use at sugar mills around Queensland.
4 were rebuilt to  gauge for use on the Yallourn 900mm Railway in Victoria, and subsequently converted to  gauge for use at sugar mills in Queensland.
13 were exported to Vietnam and 2 to Malaysia as large diesel shunters for use on  gauge.

Preservation
DH2 is retained by the Queensland Rail Heritage division. Privately owned DH71 is also on site.

DH14 was used at Old Ghan Heritage Railway and Museum, near Alice Springs, Northern Territory. Is stored due to trains not running.

In 1995, DH59 was purchased by the Puffing Billy Railway, which operates in Victoria. It has since been joined by DH5.

As of 2017, DH31 is currently re-numbered back to its original DH59.

In 2010, the Walhalla Goldfields Railway in Victoria purchased DH37. The locomotive is stored on a section of  track in the Walhalla yard, awaiting re-gauging to the Walhalla Railway's  gauge.

DH38 spent the majority of its working life in the Northern part of the state, especially around the Mackay area. Following a major failure – notably a large hole blown in the engine block following a crankcase explosion – the locomotive was withdrawn on 5 July 1991. After purchase by the ARHS Qld, DH38 underwent a major restoration involving rebuilding the engine and electrical system as well as having all axles and wheels replaced due to cracks.

Privately owned DH45 is currently leased, since 2015, to Southern Downs Steam Railway as a backup for SDSR's C17 steam locomotive.

DH73 has been acquired by DownerEDi Marybrough to be used as a shunting locomotive. It is named Hugh Boge. dead link

Status table of preserved locomotives

References

B-B locomotives
Diesel locomotives of Vietnam
Diesel-hydraulic locomotives of Australia
Railway locomotives introduced in 1966
Queensland Rail locomotives
Walkers Limited locomotives
3 ft 6 in gauge locomotives of Australia
2 ft gauge locomotives
2 ft 6 in gauge locomotives